St. Xavier's College of Education, Hindupur, (XVHP), is a coeducational teacher education school founded in 2007 by the Society of Jesus in Andhra Pradesh. It is affiliated to Sri Krishnadevaraya University in Anantapur.

The College offers a Bachelor in Education, accommodating 100 students at a time. It is a Christian minority school.

See also
 List of Jesuit sites

References  

Jesuit universities and colleges in India
Colleges of education in India
Universities and colleges in Anantapur district
Educational institutions established in 2007
2007 establishments in Andhra Pradesh